Gary Robert Locke (born 12 July 1954) is an English former footballer born in Willesden, London, who played in the Football League for Chelsea and Crystal Palace, and in the Allsvenskan for Halmstads BK.

Locke was born in Park Royal but moved to Willesden as a six-year-old with his family in 1960.

A right-back, Locke spent much of his career at Chelsea, making more than 300 league and cup appearances for the west London side between 1972 and 1983. He turned professional in July 1971, made his debut in a 3–1 win against Coventry City in the First Division on 30 September 1972, and scored his first goal for the club against the same opponents on 24 August 1974. Capable of making overlapping attacking runs up the wing, he was chosen as Chelsea Player of the Year in the 1973–74 season.

In 1983, after a spell on loan at the club, he moved to Crystal Palace on a permanent basis, making another 101 league and cup appearances in total, before spending the 1986 season in Sweden with Halmstads BK.

In 1987 Locke was brought to New Zealand by newly promoted National League club Napier City Rovers. He captained the team in 1988 and helped the club win the National League championship in 1989. Locke was left out of Napier's squad for the 1992 National League campaign.

References

External links

1954 births
Living people
Footballers from Willesden
English footballers
Association football fullbacks
Chelsea F.C. players
Crystal Palace F.C. players
Halmstads BK players
Napier City Rovers FC players
English Football League players
Allsvenskan players
English expatriate footballers
Expatriate footballers in Sweden
People educated at Willesden County Grammar School